Max Griffin may refer to:

 Maxwell Griffin (born 1987), American soccer player
 Max Griffin (fighter) (born 1985), American mixed martial artist